Karan Nagar is the notified area and the town in the city of Srinagar in the Indian administered union territory of Jammu and Kashmir. A portion of Karan Nagar in the name of Deewan Bagh was the first declared civil colony in 1942 by the former princely state government of Jammu and Kashmir. It is a posh locality of Srinagar city. The famous SMHS hospital and Government Medical College is located here.

History
The town had the decent population of Kashmiri Pandits before their exile in last decade of twentieth century. The town is named after the name Karan. At present Muslims dominate the population of the area at an estimated percentage of 99.9%.

Demographics
Kashmiri is the local language in the area, people also use English and Urdu as the official languages of the area.

Geography
The area is located at   towards north from district headquarters of Srinagar. The area is bounded by Aali Kadal towards South, Batmaloo towards West, Safa Kadal towards North and Nawabazar towards East.

See also
Lal Bazar
Rajbagh
Soura

References

 Neighbourhoods in Srinagar
 Cities and towns in Srinagar district